Kheyrabad (also Romanized as Kheyrābād; also known as Kheyrābād-e Jangal) is a village in Jangal Rural District, in the Central District of Fasa County, Fars Province, Iran. At the 2006 census, its population was 344, in 104 families.

References 

Populated places in Fasa County